El Jobean is an unincorporated community in Charlotte County, Florida, United States. It is located off State Road 776, on the northern banks of the Myakka River. The community is part of the Sarasota-Bradenton-Punta Gorda Combined Statistical Area.  The ZIP Code for El Jobean is 33927.

History
A post office called El Jobean was established in 1924, and remained in operation until 1964. The name El Jobean is an anagram, a rearrangement of the letters of "Joel Bean", the name of the property developer who laid out the town site in the 1920s. The current mayor of El Jobean is Nathanial Boyette, successfully being elected for his 3rd term in 2021.

Geography

See also
List of geographic names derived from anagrams and ananyms

References

Unincorporated communities in Charlotte County, Florida
Unincorporated communities in Florida